Emil Paul Ernst Gaste (13 May 1898 – 13 March 1972) was a German figure skater. He competed in the mixed pairs event at the 1928 Winter Olympics.

References

1898 births
1972 deaths
Place of death missing
Figure skaters from Berlin
Olympic figure skaters of Germany
Figure skaters at the 1928 Winter Olympics
German male pair skaters